Oncideres punctata is a species of beetle in the family Cerambycidae. It was described by Dillon and Dillon in 1946. It is known from Costa Rica and Mexico.

References

punctata
Beetles described in 1946